Bolding may refer to:

People
 Buddy Bolding, American former baseball coach
 Cees Bolding (1897–1979), Dutch painter
 Jim Bolding (1949–2011), American track and field athlete
 Morgan Bolding (born 1995), British rower
 Reginald Bolding,  American politician and a Democratic member of the Arizona House of Representatives
 Tysen Bolding (born 1986), American rapper professionally known as Money Man

Places
 Bolding, Arkansas, United States, an unincorporated community
 Bolding Stadium, a baseball venue in Farmville, Virginia, United States

Other uses
 Bolding, the present participle of bold; see emphasis (typography)